The FreeX Blast is a German single-place, paraglider that was designed and produced by FreeX of Egling in the mid-2000s. It is now out of production.

Design and development
The Blast was designed as an intermediate glider. Like all FreeX wings it features internal diagonal bracing. The models are each named for their relative size.

Operational history
Reviewer Noel Bertrand reported that the Blast was commercially successful in 2003.

Variants
Blast S
Small-sized model for lighter pilots. The glider model is DHV 1-2 certified.
Blast M
Mid-sized model for medium-weight pilots. The glider model is DHV 1-2 certified.
Blast L
Large-sized model for heavier pilots. The glider model is DHV 1-2 certified.

Specifications (Blast L)

References

Blast
Paragliders